Herald Clifford "Cliff" Howard (2 March 1923 – 20 November 2008) was a Canadian sailor who competed in the 1956 Summer Olympics.

References

1923 births
2008 deaths
Canadian male sailors (sport)
Olympic sailors of Canada
Sailors at the 1956 Summer Olympics – Dragon